Polianthes  is a formerly recognized genus of plants in family Asparagaceae, subfamily Agavoideae. molecular phylogenetic studies showed that Polianthes is embedded within the larger genus Agave, which has been expanded to include it. (See Agave § Taxonomy.) One of its former members is the tuberose, Agave amica, formerly Polianthes tuberosa, a plant that is commonly used in perfume making.

Species
All the species formerly placed in Polianthes are endemic to Mexico, although Agave amica has become naturalized in other places. Some species now included in Agave are listed below with synonyms from the World Checklist of Selected Plant Families.
 Polianthes bicolor E.Solano, Camacho & García-Mend. = Agave bicolor
 Polianthes densiflora (B.L.Rob. & Fernald) Shinners = Agave Agave confertiflora
 Polianthes durangensis Rose = Agave palustris
 Polianthes elongata Rose = Agave producta
 Polianthes geminiflora (Lex.) Rose = Agave coetocapnia
 Polianthes howardii Verh.-Will. = Agave howardii
 Polianthes longiflora Rose = Agave dolichantha
 Polianthes michoacana M.Cedano, Delgad. & Enciso = Agave michoacana
 Polianthes montana Rose = Agave rosei
 Polianthes multicolor E.Solano & Dávila = Agave multicolor
 Polianthes nelsonii Rose = Agave neonelsonii
 Polianthes oaxacana García-Mend. & E.Solano = Agave oaxacana
 Polianthes palustris Rose = Agave palustris
 Polianthes platyphylla Rose = Agave platyphylla
 Polianthes pringlei Rose = Agave neopringlei
 Polianthes sessiliflora (Hemsl.) Rose = Agave apedicellata
 Polianthes tuberosa L. = Agave amica
 Polianthes zapopanensis E.Solano & Ríos-Gómez = Agave zapopanensis

References

External links

Historically recognized angiosperm genera
Agavoideae